Curinus is a genus of beetle of the family Coccinellidae.

Species
 Curinus coeruleus Mulsant, 1850

References
 

Coccinellidae genera
Taxa named by Étienne Mulsant